Stephens Island is at the northernmost tip of the Marlborough Sounds in the South Island of New Zealand. It lies two kilometres to the northeast of Cape Stephens, the northernmost point of D'Urville Island.

History
The island was owned by the Ngāti Koata iwi but was taken by the government to build a lighthouse in 1891. The Māori called it Takapourewa ("around the tower") but explorer Captain Cook renamed it Stephens Island in 1770 after Sir Phillip Stephens, Secretary of the Admiralty.

The island featured in local mythos as the place where a local lighthouse keeper's cat, named Tibbles, was claimed to have caused the extinction of Lyall's wren in 1894. However, this belief was erroneous, an urban legend. While this cat did kill one of the last birds seen, a few more specimens were obtained in the following years, by which time the island also hosted numerous feral cats, and the island was only the last refuge of the bird, which had become extinct on the mainland many centuries earlier due to Polynesian rat predation.

Conservation
Today, the best known resident of Stephens Island is the tuatara. The island is a sanctuary for this rare order of reptile which is now extinct on the mainland, except in tightly controlled reserves including ecological islands.

Stephens Island is internationally important for nature conservation. While most attention has focused on the tuatara, the significant and unique factors include:
 Endemic species – those found nowhere else, either because they evolved here or because they have become extinct everywhere else – such as Hamilton's Frog, perhaps the rarest frog in the world and the Ngaio Weevil, a large flightless Weevil
 Unusual species such as the tuatara (Sphenodon punctatus), which is the sole survivor of a group of reptiles that otherwise appears to have been extinct elsewhere in the world for more than 60 million years
 Rare species – such as the Stephen's Island gecko and Cook Strait click beetle that are only found in a handful of other places, and for which Stephens Island is a stronghold
 Common species in unusual abundance – such as the more than one million seabirds, vast numbers of wētā and darkling beetles and many more
 Stephens Island is a part of a complex ecosystem that includes a vast area of ocean. An enormous number of seabirds link this small (154 ha) island to a vast marine ecosystem. The sea provides nutrients, the seabirds carry these to the island and Takapourewa provides a sanctuary for nesting birds, free of mammalian land predators.

Geography
In natural character, Stephens Island is a rugged landmass dominated by maritime influences. Visually the island is connected to the adjacent larger D'Urville Island, and Stephens Island is the largest of the family of islands, islets and rock stacks that characterise this southwestern side of the Cook Strait. Although uninhabited, the island has been extensively modified by land clearance and farming, but retains much of its wild natural character. From sea level the lighthouse is a prominent visual feature, while from the air the cluster of buildings and farmed landscape are obvious.

The surrounding sea is rich with marine life, albeit strongly modified and depleted by fishing, and historically by hunting of whales and seals.  The island overlooks one of the great whale migration routes, most notably for humpback whales.  Marine mammals such as New Zealand Fur Seals and various dolphin species are seen around the island.

This is an area of strong winds (mean annual wind speed ), strong currents and broken restless seas. The island also harbours strong gradations of weather between the often cloud-covered summit and the wave-lashed shores. There are also distinct differences between the relatively more exposed western and the less exposed eastern shores. Rainfall averages a modest .

See also

 Cats in New Zealand
 List of islands of New Zealand
 List of islands
 Desert island

References

Further reading

Uninhabited islands of New Zealand
Islands of the Marlborough Sounds